The Field is a British monthly magazine about country matters and field sports. It was started as a weekly magazine in 1853, and has remained in print since then; Robert Smith Surtees was among the founders. In the nineteenth century it was known as Field: The Country Gentleman's Newspaper. The magazine is one of the earliest hobby magazines. It is published by TI Media, subsidiary of Future plc.

Editors of The Field

 1853–1857 Mark Lemon
 1857–1888 John Henry Walsh
 1888–1899 Frederick Toms
 1900–1910 William Senior
 1910–1928 Sir Theodore Andrea Cook
 1931–1937 Eric Parker
 1938–1946 Brian Vesey-Fitzgerald
 1947–1950 Leonard V Dodds
 1951–1977 Wilson Stephens
 1977–1984 Derek Bingham
 1984–1987 Simon Courtauld
 1987–1991 Julie Spencer
 1991–2020 Jonathan Young
 2020–present Alexandra Henton

Hunting and racing editors
 1928–1936 William Fawcett

Notes

1853 establishments in the United Kingdom
Hunting and fishing magazines
Magazines established in 1853
Monthly magazines published in the United Kingdom
Sports magazines published in the United Kingdom
Weekly magazines published in the United Kingdom